Zombie Live is the first live album from heavy metal artist Rob Zombie. The CD was recorded over several nights during the band's Educated Horses tour and was said to include a 36-page super-deluxe book of never-before-seen live pictures and a DVD of live footage and animated videos. After the release of the album no artbook or DVD were included with the release of the album. Blabbermouth.net reported that the DVD companion would be available in spring 2008, but this still has yet to surface. A different concert film, The Zombie Horror Picture Show, was released in 2014.

Reception
The album debuted at number 57 on the Billboard 200, selling 15,000 copies its first week. The song "The Lords of Salem" was nominated the Grammy for Best Hard Rock Performance in 2009 for the version appearing here.

Track listing

Personnel
Rob Zombie – Vocals
John 5 – Guitar
Piggy D. – Bass
Tommy Clufetos – Drums

References

Rob Zombie live albums
Albums produced by Rob Zombie
Albums produced by Scott Humphrey
2007 live albums
Geffen Records live albums